Zack Zero is a 2.5D platform-adventure video game developed and published by Crocodile Entertainment via PlayStation Network on January 17, 2012 and Microsoft Windows on April 29, 2013. 

The player is involved in helping Zack Zero save his partner Marlene from Evil Zulrog, who wishes to exchange her for a unique material involved in time travel called Kelestinia.

References

External links 
 

2012 video games
Dinosaurs in video games
Indie video games
PlayStation 3 games
PlayStation Network games
Platform games
Science fiction video games
Side-scrolling video games
Superhero video games
Video games about time travel
Video games developed in Spain
Video games with 2.5D graphics
Windows games